Family Day is a public holiday in the countries of Angola, Israel, South Africa, Uruguay, Vanuatu, and Vietnam; in the Australian Capital Territory; in the Canadian provinces of Alberta, British Columbia, Ontario, Saskatchewan and soon New Brunswick and Nova Scotia; in the American states of Arizona and Nevada; and as the second day of Songkran in Thailand.

Australia

Australian Capital Territory 
Family and Community Day was celebrated on the first Tuesday of November from 2007 to 2009, coinciding with the Melbourne Cup. This public holiday was declared in 2007. Andrew Barr, then ACT Minister for Industrial Relations, stated the purpose of the new public holiday was:

"...to enable workers to take a break from their hectic work and to spend some quality time with their family and friends. ... Australians do work the longest hours of any country in the western world. We do deserve a break."

In the years 2010–2016, the date was moved to the first Monday of the September/October school holidays. Where the first Monday of the school holidays falls on the ACT Labour Day public holiday (first Monday in October), the holiday is moved to the second Monday of the ACT school holidays.

In 2018, Family and Community Day will no longer be a public holiday in the ACT. Replacing it is Reconciliation Day, held on the first Monday on or after May 27.

Angola
Celebrated on December 25.

Canada 

Nearly two-thirds of Canadians reside in a province that observes a statutory holiday on the third Monday of February. The holiday is called Family Day in five provinces (Alberta, British Columbia, New Brunswick, Ontario and Saskatchewan), Louis Riel Day in Manitoba, and Islander Day in Prince Edward Island. There is no federally established Family Day.

This holiday was first observed in Alberta in 1990, followed by Saskatchewan in 2007 and Ontario in 2008. On May 28, 2012, the BC government announced that Family Day would be observed on the second Monday in February each year, starting February 11, 2013. In February 2018, the BC government announced that Family Day would move to the third Monday in February from 2019 onward, aligning the holiday with other Canadian provinces. In April 2017, the NB government announced the family statutory holiday to begin in February 2018. 

As a new holiday, there are no traditional activities that are associated with the day. Canadians use the long weekend for whatever purpose they like. In at least British Columbia, the decision to add this public holiday was due to the lengthy gap between the New Year's Day and Good Friday public holidays. Otherwise, Canadian provinces have a public holiday at least every other month.

Family Day is unrelated to National Family Week, a campaign put on each October by the Canadian Association of Family Resource Programs.

Israel 
In the 1990s, the last day of Shevat was declared Family Day in Israel.

South Africa 
After 1995, Easter Monday was renamed Family Day.

United States 
Family Day is a state holiday in Nevada, celebrated on the day after Thanksgiving, i.e. the Friday following the fourth Thursday in November.

American Family Day is a state holiday in Arizona and has been celebrated on the first Sunday in August since 1978.

Uruguay 
In Uruguay, the public holiday on December 25 is officially known as Family Day rather than Christmas, for the sake of secularism.

Vanuatu 
Family Day in Vanuatu is celebrated annually on December 26, traditionally Boxing Day, as a day on which school and work are suspended to spend the day giving thanks for and enjoying time with one's family, often by engaging in civic and religious events and a festive meal.

Vietnam 
Vietnamese Family Day occurs on the 28th of June each year, having been established in 2001. Family-oriented activities and events are organised throughout the country, though it is not a public holiday.

References 

Types of secular holidays
February observances
September observances
October observances
November observances
December observances
Holidays and observances by scheduling (nth weekday of the month)
Christian festivals and holy days
Family member holidays
he:יום המשפחה